Khouw is a Dutch-based romanization of the Hokkien surname Xǔ (許) in West Java, Indonesia. In Central and East Java, Kho is a more common romanization. 

Several (unrelated) families of this surname include:
 The Khouw family of Tamboen, part of the Cabang Atas or the traditional Chinese establishment of colonial Indonesia:
 Liutenant Khouw Tian Sek, a landlord in the Dutch East Indies and patriarch of the Khouw family of Tamboen
 Liutenant Khouw Tjeng Kee, a landlord
 Liutenant Khouw Tjeng Tjoan, a landlord
 Liutenant Khouw Tjeng Po, a landlord
 Oen Giok Khouw, a prominent philanthropist and landowner in the Dutch East Indies
 Kapitein Khouw Yauw Kie, a bureaucrat and landlord in the Dutch East Indies
 Majoor Khouw Kim An, a high-ranking Chinese Indonesian bureaucrat, public figure and landlord in the Dutch East Indies
 The Chinese-Indonesian millionaire Khouw Kim Goan's family of the late colonial era: 
 Khouw Keng Nio, pioneering aviator and businesswoman 
 Khouw Khe Hien, pioneering aviator and businessman

References

Hokkien-language surnames